Lamberto Leoni (born 24 May 1953 in Argenta) is a former racing driver from Italy.  He participated in five Formula One World Championship Grands Prix, failing to qualify for three of them.  He scored no championship points.

Career
After racing in Italian Formula 3 and Formula 2 with mixed results, Leoni moved into Formula One with a hired Surtees TS19 at the 1977 Italian Grand Prix, but failed to qualify. The following year he joined Ensign but left after two more failures to qualify.

Leoni returned to Formula 2 and then Formula 3000, forming his own First Racing team in 1987. In 1989 the team made an abortive attempt to enter Formula One with a car which was later used by the unsuccessful Life outfit. He subsequently managed the career of Marco Apicella.

Following his F3000 activities, Leoni became involved in powerboat racing, winning many races and almost winning the 1993 World Championship.

Racing record

Complete European Formula Two Championship results
(key) (Races in bold indicate pole position; races in italics indicate fastest lap)

Complete International Formula 3000 results
(key) (Races in bold indicate pole position; races in italics indicate fastest lap.)

Complete Formula One World Championship results
(key)

24 Hours of Le Mans results

References

Sources
Profile at www.grandprix.com

1953 births
Living people
Sportspeople from the Province of Ferrara
Italian racing drivers
Italian Formula One drivers
Surtees Formula One drivers
Ensign Formula One drivers
Formula One team owners
Formula One team principals
European Formula Two Championship drivers
International Formula 3000 drivers
Italian motorboat racers
24 Hours of Le Mans drivers
World Sportscar Championship drivers
Team LeMans drivers